Ibrahim al-Ifriqi was a ninth century governor of the Yemen for the Abbasid Caliphate.

A member of the Banu Shayban, Ibrahim was appointed as governor during the caliphate of al-Ma'mun (r. 813–833), in place of Hisn ibn al-Minhal. He was in turn eventually replaced by the joint governors Nu'aym ibn al-Waddah al-Azdi and al-Muzaffar ibn Yahya al-Kindi.

Notes

References 
 
 
 

Abbasid governors of Yemen
Banu Shayban
9th century in Yemen
9th-century people from the Abbasid Caliphate
9th-century Arabs